Lavaca County is a county located in the U.S. state of Texas. As of the 2010 census, its population was 20,337. Its county seat is Hallettsville. The county was created in 1846. It is named for the Lavaca River, which curves its way southeast through Moulton and Hallettsville before reaching the coast at Matagorda Bay.

Geography

Major highways
  U.S. Highway 77
  U.S. Highway 77 Alternate
  U.S. Highway 90 Alternate
  State Highway 95
  State Highway 111

Adjacent counties
 Fayette County (north)
 Colorado County (northeast)
 Jackson County (southeast)
 Victoria County (south)
 DeWitt County (southwest)
 Gonzales County (northwest)

Demographics

Note: the US Census treats Hispanic/Latino as an ethnic category. This table excludes Latinos from the racial categories and assigns them to a separate category. Hispanics/Latinos can be of any race.

As of the census of 2000, 19,210 people, 7,669 households, and 5,391 families were residing in the county.  The population density was 20 people per square mile (8/km2).  The 9,657 housing units had an average density of 10 per square mile (4/km2).  The racial makeup of the county was 86.86% White, 6.79% African American, 0.19% Native American, 0.16% Asian,  4.86% from other races, and 1.14% from two or more races.  About 11.36% of the population were Hispanics or Latinos of any race. Of descent, 27.0% were of Czech, 24.1% German, 9.1% American, and 5.1% Irish ancestry according to Census 2000; 86.3% spoke English, 7.7% Spanish, 4.6% Czech and 1.2% German as their first language.
In terms of ancestry in 2016, 32.8% were of German, 30.7% were of Czech, 10.8% were of Irish, 5.4% were of English, 3.4% were of American], and 2.2% were French.

Of the 7,669 households, 30.0% had children under 18 living with them, 57.7% were married couples living together, 9.3% had a female householder with no husband present, and 29.7% were not families. About 27.6% of all households were made up of individuals, and 16.6% had someone living alone who was 65 or older.  The average household size was 2.44, and the average family size was 2.98.

In the county, the age distribution was 24.2% under 18, 6.90% from 18 to 24, 23.50% from 25 to 44, 23.60% from 45 to 64, and 21.80% who were 65 or older.  The median age was 42 years. For every 100 females, there were 93.10 males.  For every 100 females 18 and over, there were 88.50 males.

The median income for a household was $29,132, and for a family was $36,760. Males had a median income of $26,988 versus $17,537 for females. The per capita income for the county was $16,398.  About 10.20% of families and 13.20% of the population were below the poverty line, including 15.20% of those under age 18 and 18.40% of those age 65 or over.

Education
These school public school districts are located in Lavaca County:
 Hallettsville Independent School District
 Moulton Independent School District
 Shiner Independent School District
 Sweet Home Independent School District
 Vysehrad Independent School District
 Yoakum Independent School District
 Ezzell Independent School District

Communities

Cities
 Hallettsville (county seat)
 Shiner
 Yoakum (partly in DeWitt County)

Town
 Moulton

Unincorporated communities
 Breslau
 Sweet Home
 Speaks
 Sublime

Politics
Lavaca County is a very conservative county and has been getting more conservative since 1992. The last Democrat to win the county was Jimmy Carter in 1976. Donald Trump carried it substantially in the 2020 presidential election. His margin was over 70% against Joe Biden.

See also

 List of museums in South Texas
 National Register of Historic Places listings in Lavaca County, Texas
 Recorded Texas Historic Landmarks in Lavaca County

References

External links
 Lavaca County website
 
 https://web.archive.org/web/20101205061757/http://www.tamu.edu/ccbn/dewitt/freelavaca.htm

 
1846 establishments in Texas
Populated places established in 1846
Czech-American culture in Texas